Harpegnathos saltator, sometimes called the Indian jumping ant or Jerdon's jumping ant, is a species of ant found in India. They have long mandibles and have the ability to leap a few inches. They are large-eyed and active predators that hunt mainly in the early morning. The colonies are small and the difference between workers and queens is very slight.

Subspecies
H. s. cruentatus (Smith, 1858)
H. s. taprobanae Forel, 1909

Habits

Unlike other ants, they are seen singly or in small groups and their colonies consist of very few individuals. They are also unusual amongst ants in that the queen-worker difference is very limited and some workers can mate and lay fertilized eggs just like the queen. These workers are termed gamergates. New colonies are founded independently by single queens, and on aging, they are replaced by several gamergates. The gamergates copulate with males from their own colonies, and being inbred, are related to the original founding queen. Colonies never undergo fission to form new colonies. 

The workers limit the number of reproductives in the colony by policing new workers that try to lay eggs when an active queen or established gamergates are present. Workers use alarm pheromones that include 4-methyl-3-heptanone, 4-methyl-3-heptanol, and isopentyl isopentanoate. H. saltator, like many species of ants, produces 4-methyl-3-heptanone from mandibular glands. Dufour's gland secretions have been found to include a complex mixture of linear hydrocarbons from C15 to C25, with (Z)-9-tricosene being the main constituent, along with other minor constituents such as tetradecyl propionate and traces of tetradecyl acetate and dodecyl acetate. Both the secretions from the postpharyngeal glands and the cuticular wax include methyl esters of common fatty acids.

Their leaps are accomplished by synchronized abduction of the middle and hind pairs of legs. They can jump up to 2 cm high and 10 cm far. These leaps are made not only to escape, but also to catch flying prey. The workers forage only during the cool hours of the morning and afternoon with a lull in activity during midday.

The nest entrance is usually a low mound on the ground with the entrance surrounded by twigs and leaves. The nest entrance is closed by the ants in the evening, and is reopened in the day. The main chamber has a funnel-like opening in the antechamber, and this structure is believed to prevent flooding of the main chamber.

A study of the genome and expressed genes found that the production of enzymes that slow aging (telomerase and sirtuin deacetylases) are increased when workers turn into queens. The workers also undergo a reduction in their brain size upon becoming reproductives (or gamergates).

Description

The following is the original description by T. C. Jerdon.

The following is the taxonomic description from C. T. Bingham's Fauna of British India (Hymenoptera – Volume 2):
 Worker: Head, thorax and pedicel ferruginous red, closely and rather coarsely punctured, granulated; abdomen black, shining, not granulated, with punctures finer and more scattered ; mandibles, antennae, and legs yellow; the whole insect covered with short, sparse, erect pale hairs, and a minute, fine, sericeous shining pubescence on the mandibles, head, antennae, thorax, and legs, visible only in certain lights. 
 Queen: Similar to the worker; the ocelli placed very low down, almost in the middle of the front of the head.
 Male: Mandibles short, triangular, rather wide, but not elongated. Head somewhat longer than broad, strongly constricted behind the eyes and up to the occipital articulation. Concavity in front shorter and broader than in D. venator. Posterior face of the metanotum strongly margined. First abdominal segment pyriform elongated as in D. venator. No constriction between the basal two segments. A small median carina is behind the occiput. Smooth and shining. Metanotum, pedicel and a part of the sides of the mesonotum coarsely rugose. Some foveae or obsolete striae on the rest of the thorax. Pilosity as in D. venator. Reddish brown, the  pedicel darker. Abdomen brown. Legs and antennae pale testaceous. Wings hyaline, nervures, and stigma very pale. (Based on Forel)

References

External links

 Tree of Life
 Ant web
 These ants shrink their brains and balloon their ovaries

Ponerinae
Hymenoptera of Asia
Insects of India
Insects described in 1851
Taxa named by Thomas C. Jerdon